Elizabeth Alexander (sometimes credited as Liz Alexander; born 21 August 1952) is an Australian actress, director and teacher.

Personal life
Alexander was born in Adelaide, South Australia, but now lives in Sydney. She attended All Hallows' School in Brisbane.  She was married to actor George Spartels from 1984 to 2006 and has two daughters. She currently works at Queenwood School for Girls as a dramatic arts teacher.

Career
Alexanders' acting career began early with a part in the series Bellbird in 1967.  However, it was straight from graduating at National Institute of Dramatic Art (NIDA) that she got her big break with the part of Esther Wolcott in the Australian Broadcasting Corporation (ABC) series Seven Little Australians.  Allegedly the producers had all but given up on the show, because they did not feel that they had found a suitable actress for the part, until they discovered Alexander.  She was actually younger than actress Barbara Llewellyn, who played her stepdaughter Meg in the series, but producers and audiences felt that they were both convincing in their roles.

The ten-part series delivered huge ratings when it was broadcast in 1973, and was also the first ABC series to enjoy international acclaim. It went on to win three Australian Film Institute Awards and four Penguins, including best drama series and the 1974 George Wallace Memorial Logie for Best New Talent for Alexander as the sweet-tempered Esther.  The series is now available on DVD.

Alexander had a recurring guest role in the high rating Australian medical drama All Saints as the viper-like Dr. Alison Newell, ex-wife of Dr. Frank Campion, played by John Howard.  She was not initially written as his ex-wife, as her character appeared before Howard joined the cast.  Apparently, it was the sharp onscreen dynamic between Alexander and Howard in their early scenes together that made the writers decide to write this history into Alexander's character.

Other television credits include:  Home and Away (she played Christine Jones, the overprotective conservative mother of Melody Jones), Silent Number, Special Squad, Chopper Squad, Farscape, Murder Call, Seven Deadly Sins (Pride), Salem's Lot and Time Trax, a science fiction series in which she starred as a computer hologram alongside Dale Midkiff.

Her film work includes: the lead role in The Killing of Angel Street (which won an award at the Berlin Film Festival) opposite John Hargreaves, The Chant of Jimmie Blacksmith, Summerfield with Nick Tate and John Waters, Sebastian and the Sparrow and The Journalist with Sam Neill.  2010 saw her appear in a thriller called The Clinic and in 2011 she made an appearance in Fred Schepisi's The Eye of the Storm.

Her theatre credits are also numerous and include:  Hermione in The Winter's Tale, Portia in The Merchant of Venice for which she received glowing reviews, Martha in the Sydney Theatre Company's production of Who's Afraid of Virginia Woolf? for which she again received extremely positive reviews, Kate in another STC production of Harold Pinter's Old Times and many more.  She also played anthropologist Margaret Mead in David Williamson's play Heretic.  The play, based on Mead's life and work, was the subject of much debate and controversy due to the very public row between the writer, Williamson, and the director Wayne Harrison over the play's production.

Alexander has also directed a number of plays and written several screenplays, including a short film titled Memento (which was sold to Village Roadshow) which she also directed, about the emotional problems caused by the return of a father to his family, a young boy and his mother.  She also directed a feature film,  A Spy in the Family.  Alongside this she also does voiceover work.

Filmography 

FILM

Television

TELEVISION

Theatre
 The Great – Catherine The Great (Sydney Theatre Company) 2008 
 Old Times – Kate (STC) 2005
 Heretic– Margaret Mead (Sydney Theatre Company)
 Who's Afraid of Virginia Woolf? – Martha (Sydney Theatre Company)
 Prin – Dibbs (Marian Street Theatre)
 The Three Sisters – Irina
 Butley (Old Tote Theatre)
 Season At Sarsparilla (Old Tote Theatre Company )
 Mothers and Fathers – Julia (Twelfth Night Theatre)
 Uncle Vanya – Yelena (Melbourne Theatre Company)
 Macbeth – Lady Macduff (Melbourne Theatre Company)
 The Rivals – Julia (Melbourne Theatre Company)
 Betrayal – Emma (Melbourne Theatre Company)
 Arms and the Man – Raina (Melbourne Theatre Company)
 Godsend – Jenny (Melbourne Theatre Company)
 Maid's Tragedy – Lead (Melbourne Theatre Company)
 She Stoops to Conquer – Kate (Nimrod Theatre Company )
 Wild Honey – Sasha (Nimrod Theatre)
 The Merchant of Venice – Portia (Nimrod Theatre)
 All's Well That Ends Well – Diana (Nimrod Theatre)
 Tartuffe – Elmire (Nimrod Theatre)
 A Winter's Tale – Hermione (Nimrod Theatre)

Director
 The Maids – Melbourne Theatre Company
 Shorts – Sydney Theatre Company
 Memento – (writer/director) short film
 A Spy in the Family – feature film

Producer
 Foursome (short film)

Quote

References

External links
 

1952 births
20th-century Australian actresses
21st-century Australian actresses
Living people
Actresses from Adelaide
Australian film actresses
Australian stage actresses
Australian television actresses
Logie Award winners
National Institute of Dramatic Art alumni